Vijay Baghel (born 15 August 1959) is an Indian politician who serves as the Member of Parliament, Lok Sabha from Durg as a member of the Bharatiya Janata Party.

Political career
Baghel was first elected to Bhilai Municipal Council in 2000 as an Independent candidate. He contested 2003 Assembly election from Patan constituency as a candidate Nationalist Congress Party but lost to Bhupesh Baghel. Again, he contested 2008 Assembly election as a BJP candidate and won by defeating Bhupesh Baghel of Congress by a huge margin of 7,842 votes and became Parliamentary Secretary to Home Minister Nanki Ram Kanwar. Again, Vijay contested 2013 Assembly election against Bhupesh Baghel but failed to retain the seat. In the 2019 general election, he contested against Pratima Chandrakar of INC from Durg and won by margin of 3,91,978 votes.

References

External links
 Official biographical sketch in Parliament of India website

India MPs 2019–present
Lok Sabha members from Chhattisgarh
Living people
Bharatiya Janata Party politicians from Chhattisgarh
1959 births
Chhattisgarh MLAs 2008–2013